The Wildlife Conservation Society of Tanzania (WCST) is an independent, membership and non-profit making organization founded in 1988 in Tanzania. Its main objective is to assist the government in conserving flora, fauna and the environment within Tanzania.

See also 
Uluguru bushshrike

External links
WCST Official Website

Nature conservation in Tanzania
Wildlife conservation organizations
Animal welfare organisations based in Tanzania
Bird conservation organizations
Environmental organizations established in 1988
1988 establishments in Tanzania